Colfax station is a Regional Transportation District (RTD) light rail station on the R Line in Aurora, Colorado. The station is located on the light rail bridge elevated above Colfax Avenue between Fitzsimons Parkway and Interstate 225.

The station opened on February 24, 2017, along with the rest of the R Line.

History

The station was one of two planned in 2001 on the former Fitzsimons Army Medical Center, an area that Fitzsimons Redevelopment Authority developed into a campus anchored by the then University of Colorado Health Sciences Center. The second planned for the former Fitzsimons Army Medical Center became Fitzsimons station.

References

RTD light rail stations
Transportation buildings and structures in Aurora, Colorado
Railway stations in the United States opened in 2017
2017 establishments in Colorado